Paritala Anjaneya Temple is a temple residing a statue of Bhagavan Hanuman. The status of this statue being the second tallest one dedicated to Bhagavan Hanuman in the world has been replaced by another statue located at Manav Bharti University, Solan, with a height of 155 ft and 2 inches. The current record is held by the statue in Madapam, Srikakulam district on the banks of the river Vamsadhara in North Andhra (171 ft). It has also been awarded by the Limca Book of Records. The temple is located in the village of Paritala on NH-65, approximately 30 km from the city of Vijayawada, in the Indian state of Andhra Pradesh.

The tallest Lord Hanuman statue outside India is at Carapichaima, Trinidad and Tobago, which is 85 ft tall.

See also
List of statues
List of tallest statues

References

External links

Colossal statues in India
Outdoor sculptures in India
2003 sculptures
Hindu temples in Krishna district
Tourist attractions in Krishna district
Hanuman temples